Białopole may refer to the following places in Poland:
Białopole, Lower Silesian Voivodeship (south-west Poland)
Białopole, Lublin Voivodeship (east Poland)